The following is a list of transfers for 2014 Malaysian football.

Malaysia Super League
The 2014 Astro Malaysia Super League (also known as Astro Liga Super Malaysia 2014 in Malay and the Astro  Malaysia Super League due to the sponsorship from Astro) is the 11th season of the highest Malaysian football league since its inception in 2004. Twelve teams participated in the league with Singapore LIONSXII as the defending champions.

Teams participating in the 2014 AFC Cup (Kelantan FA and Selangor FA) can employ one extra foreign players, as the AFC allows four foreign players, of which one of them must be an Asian player, but the fourth foreign players are only allowed to play in the AFC Cup 2014 Tournament.

LionsXII will not be permitted to have any foreign players as it is intended to remain as a development team for Singaporean players.

FAM allow three foreign players quota starts season 2014, and one must be from Asian countries.

ATM FA

Transfers in

Transfers out

Johor Darul Takzim

Transfers in

Transfers out

Kelantan FA

Transfers in

Transfers out

Pahang FA

Transfers in

Transfers out

Perak FA

Transfers in

Transfers out

PKNS

Transfers in

Transfers out

Sarawak FA

Transfer In

Transfers out

Selangor FA

Transfers in

Transfers out

Sime Darby FC

Transfers in

Transfers out

LionsXII

Transfers in

Transfers out

Terengganu FA

Transfers in

Transfers out

T-Team FC

Transfers in

Transfers out

Malaysia Premier League
The 2014 Malaysia Premier League is the eleventh season of the second division in the Malaysian football league since its establishment in 2004.

FAM allow three foreign players quota starts season 2014, and one must be from Asian countries.

Felda United FC

Transfers in

Transfers out

Johor Darul Takzim II

Transfers in

Transfers out

Kedah FA

Transfer in
Billy Mehmet
Saiful Amar Sudar
Franco Gomez
Nam Kung Woong

Transfers out

Negeri Sembilan FA

Transfers in

Transfers out

PBAPP FC

Transfers in

Transfers out

PDRM FA

Transfers in

Transfers out

Penang FA

Transfers in

Transfers out

Perlis FA

Transfers in

Transfers out

DRB-Hicom FC

Transfers in

Transfers out

Putrajaya SPA FC

Transfers in

Sabah FA

Transfers in

Transfers out

UiTM FC

Transfers in

Transfers out

Harimau Muda B

Transfers in

Malaysia FAM League
The 2014 Malaysia FAM League (referred to as the FAM League) is the 62nd season of the FAM League since its establishment in 1952. The league is currently the third level football league in Malaysia.

Malacca United F.C.

Transfers in

Transfers out

Kuala Lumpur FA

Transfers in

Transfers out

Harimau Muda C

Transfers in

Transfers out

Sungai Ara

Transfers in

See also

 2014 Malaysia Super League
 2014 Malaysia Premier League
 2014 Malaysia FAM League
 2014 Malaysia FA Cup
 2014 Malaysia Cup

References

2014
Transfers 1
Malaysia